Les deux orphelines vampires (English: The Two Orphan Vampires) is a 1997 French fantasy horror/drama film directed by Jean Rollin. The film was an adaptation of Rollin's novel of the same name. Rollin was primarily known for his vampire-themed works, but Les deux orphelines vampires was actually Rollin's first vampire film since 1979's Fascination.

Plot
Louise and Henriette are a pair of orphaned sisters, innocent and sightless. After sunset, though, they begin to see (although they see everything through a shade of blue) and to crave blood. The girls embark on a journey through the city of Paris to find victims and quench their thirst, otherwise they would die. Their only refuges are the cemeteries, where they find solitude and piece together the fragmented memories of their past lives.

Cast
 Alexandra Pic as Louise
 Isabelle Teboul as Henriette
 Bernard Charnacé as Dr. Dennary
 Nathalie Perrey as Nun
 Anne Duguël as Mother Superior
 Nathalie Karsenty
 Anissa Berkani-Rohmer
 Raymond Audemard
 Tina Aumont as Ghoul
 Catherine Day
 Camille Delamarre
 Véronique Djaouti as Venus
 Michel Franck
 Frederique Haymann
 Paulette Jauffre

Production
The film was shot on location in Paris and New York. The same locations were used in Rollin's 1989 film Perdues dans New York (Lost in New York).

Reception
The film has received mixed reviews. Online reviewer DVD Resurrections has said that the film is "fairly good if one is in the right mood", and gave the film 6.5 out of 10. Online reviewer Digital Vampiric Discs has said, "You'll probably find it boring if you're not used to Rollin's style, and even if you are you'll probably have to be in the mood for this one". Götterdämmerung said that it is "an interesting little film that is a bit plodding in places and that requires some patience to decide", and that "nevertheless a rewarding viewing experience".

Home media
Les deux orphelines vampires was released by Kino Lorber on DVD in 1997 and on Blu-ray in 2012.

References

External links
 

1997 films
1990s French-language films
French dark fantasy films
French vampire films
Films based on French novels
Films shot in New York City
Films shot in Paris
1990s French films